Anemos Agapis (Greek: Ανεμος Αγαπις) is the third studio album by Greek singer Eleni Foureira. The album was released in Greece and Cyprus on December 22, 2014 by Minos-EMI S.A.

Singles
Anemos Agapis includes the singles Radevou Sti Paralia, Tranquila (with J Balvin which was Foureira's first number one in Greek), Party Sleep Repeat (PSR), which was a joint release with her new label Panik Records, and Mou 'Pan I Agapi.

Track listing

Chart performance

Music videos

Lyric videos

Release history

References

2014 albums
Eleni Foureira albums
Minos EMI albums